The New Year Island, part of the New Year Group, is a  granite island and game reserve located in the Great Australian Bight, lying off the north-west coast of Tasmania, Australia. While much smaller in area than the adjacent King Island, the New Year Island lends its name to the island group due to its European discovery a few days earlier than the King Island.

The island forms part of the King Island Important Bird Area because of its importance for breeding seabirds and waders.

Other islands in the King Island Group include King, Christmas, Little Christmas, and Councillor islands.

Fauna
Breeding seabird and shorebird species include short-tailed shearwater, fairy prion, Pacific gull, silver gull and sooty oystercatcher. Reptiles include tiger snake, white's skink, metallic skink and eastern blue-tongued lizard. A species of mouse is present.

See also

 List of islands of Tasmania

References

Islands of North West Tasmania
Important Bird Areas of Tasmania
King Island (Tasmania)